Nanne is a given name. Notable people with the name include:

Feminine 

Nanne Dahlman (born 1970), Finnish tennis player
Nanne Grönvall (born 1962), Swedish singer-songwriter
Nanne Meyer (born 1953), German artist

Masculine 

Nanne Bergstrand (born 1956), Swedish footballer
Nanne Choda, 12th-century Telugu poet 
Nanne Sluis (born 1983), Dutch rower
Nanne Zwiep (1894–1942), Dutch pastor

Unisex given names
Dutch feminine given names
Dutch masculine given names
Frisian masculine given names
German feminine given names
Norwegian feminine given names
Swedish feminine given names
Swedish masculine given names